Denico Autry (born July 15, 1990) is an American football outside linebacker for the Tennessee Titans of the National Football League (NFL). He attended Albemarle High School in Albemarle, North Carolina and first enrolled at East Mississippi Community College. He then transferred to play college football at Mississippi State, and was signed as an undrafted free agent by the Oakland Raiders.

Early years
Autry played high school football for the Albemarle High School Bulldogs. He finished  his senior season with 104 solo tackles, 38 assists, 9.0 sacks, five forced fumbles and four fumble recoveries. He was named the All-SNAP Defensive Player of the Year, as well as the Rocky River Conference Defensive Player of the Year and played in the NCCA East-West All-Star game.

College career
Autry first played college football for the East Mississippi Lions of East Mississippi Community College, helping lead the Lions to a 12–0 record, state championship and NJCAA national title. He was named 2011 NJCAA Football All-America First-team.

He transferred to play for the Mississippi State Bulldogs from 2012 to 2013. Autry played in 26 games, starting 23. He recorded 73 total tackles, 16 tackles for loss, six sacks and three forced fumbles in his two-year career.

College statistics

Professional career

Oakland Raiders

Autry was signed by the Oakland Raiders of the NFL on May 20, 2014, after going undrafted in the 2014 NFL Draft. He made his NFL debut on October 2, 2014, against the Cleveland Browns, recording two tackles. He played in ten games for the Raiders in 2014, accumulating thirteen combined tackles.

Autry played in fourteen games, starting eight, for the team during the 2015 season, totaling 22 combined tackles, three sacks, three passes deflections and one safety.

The Raiders offered him a one-year exclusive rights tender on March 9, 2016, which Autry eventually signed.

Autry was offered a restricted free agent tender after the conclusion of the 2017 season. He officially signed his tender on April 17, 2017.

Indianapolis Colts
On March 14, 2018, Autry signed a three-year, $17.8 million contract with the Indianapolis Colts. In Week 14, Autry recorded a career-high three sacks and two forced fumbles in a 6–0 loss to the Jacksonville Jaguars. He followed that performance week two, with a pair of sacks in a 24–21 upset win over the Houston Texans, earning him AFC Defensive Player of the Week.

Autry finished the 2019 season with 32 tackles, 3.5 sacks, and a forced fumble in 14 games played.  Autry sat out the last two games of the season after suffering a concussion in Week 15 of the season.

Autry made his return from injury in Week 1 against the Jacksonville Jaguars.  During the game, Autry recorded his first two sacks of the season on Gardner Minshew in the 27–20 loss.
In Week 8 against the Detroit Lions, Autry recorded two sacks on Matthew Stafford during the 41–21 win. Autry was placed on the reserve/COVID-19 list by the team on November 20, 2020, and activated on December 3.

In the Wild Card Round of the playoffs against the Buffalo Bills, Autry sacked Josh Allen 1.5 times and forced a fumble during the 27–24 loss.

Tennessee Titans

On March 18, 2021, Autry signed a three-year, $21.5 million deal with the Tennessee Titans.

Career statistics

References

External links
Indianapolis Colts bio
East Mississippi Lions bio
NFL Draft Scout
College stats

Living people
1990 births
Players of American football from North Carolina
People from Albemarle, North Carolina
American football defensive ends
African-American players of American football
East Mississippi Lions football players
Mississippi State Bulldogs football players
Oakland Raiders players
Indianapolis Colts players
Tennessee Titans players
21st-century African-American sportspeople